Unión Deportivo Ascensión is a Peruvian football club, located in the city of Huancavelica, Peru. 

The club is the largest in Ascensión city and one of the largest in Huancavelica Province. 

The club was founded 18 July 1959 and play in the Copa Perú which is the third division of the Peruvian league.

History
The club was founded July 18, 1959. 

In the 1980 Copa Perú, the club classified to the Regional Stage, but was eliminated by and Miguel Grau and Atlético Centenario.

In the 2002 Copa Perú, the club classified to the National Stage but was eliminated by León de Huánuco in the quarterfinals.

In the 2010 Copa Perú, the club classified to the Regional Stage, but was eliminated by and Cultural Joe Gutiérrez and Froebel Deportes.

Honours

Regional
Región V:
Winners (1): 2002

Liga Departamental de Huancavelica:
Winners (6): 1980, 2002, 2015, 2016, 2018, 2019
Runner-up (2): 2010, 2012

See also
List of football clubs in Peru
Peruvian football league system

References

Football clubs in Peru
Association football clubs established in 1959
1959 establishments in Peru